East Union is an unincorporated community in Wayne County, in the U.S. state of Ohio.

History
The community is located within East Union Township, which was named after Union, Maine. A post office called East Union was established in 1831, and remained in operation until 1907. Besides the post office, East Union had a country store.

References

Unincorporated communities in Wayne County, Ohio
Unincorporated communities in Ohio